Pakeeza   is a Hindi album by Zubeen Garg, released in 2013 with eight numbers of romantic songs under the banner of Times Music. The album was released in Guwahati Medical College auditorium during the event of Prag Cine Awards, 2013.
It took 6 years in the making of this album.
His feat of more than 20,000 songs in 30 languages over the past 28 years certainly speaks volumes about the versatility of Zubeen Garg as a singer. But it doesn't even come close to describing his uber iconic status in north east India.

Track listing

References

 
 

Zubeen Garg albums
2013 albums